The North Fork Smoky Hill River is a river in the central Great Plains of North America. A tributary of the Smoky Hill River, it flows from eastern Colorado into western Kansas.

Geography
The North Fork Smoky Hill River rises in the High Plains region of the Great Plains. From there, the river flows east then east-northeast into Kansas. In south-central Sherman County, it has been dammed to form a small reservoir, Sherman State Fishing Lake.

Hydrology
The river is intermittent with water flowing only during and after rains.

See also
List of rivers of Colorado
List of rivers of Kansas

References

Rivers of Kansas
Rivers of Colorado
Rivers of Cheyenne County, Colorado
Tributaries of the Kansas River
Rivers of Logan County, Kansas